Cho Song-Hwa (born ) is a South Korean female volleyball player. She was part of the South Korea women's national volleyball team.

She participated in the 2015 FIVB Volleyball Women's World Cup.
On club level she played for Heungkuk Life Insurance in 2015.

In April 2020, IBK Altos revealed that Song-hwa, on FA status, will be moving to their club.

References

External links
 Profile at FIVB.org

1993 births
Living people
South Korean women's volleyball players
People from Busan
Sportspeople from Busan